The Newcastle Main Post Office is a historic post office building in Newcastle, Wyoming. Built in 1932, it was constructed as part of a facilities improvement program by the United States Post Office Department. The post office in Newcastle was nominated to the National Register of Historic Places as part of a thematic study comprising twelve Wyoming post offices built to standardized USPO plans in the early twentieth century.

References

External links
 at the National Park Service's NRHP database
Newcastle Main Post Office at the Wyoming State Historic Preservation Office

Neoclassical architecture in Wyoming
Government buildings completed in 1932
Buildings and structures in Weston County, Wyoming
Post office buildings in Wyoming
Post office buildings on the National Register of Historic Places in Wyoming
National Register of Historic Places in Weston County, Wyoming
Newcastle, Wyoming
Individually listed contributing properties to historic districts on the National Register in Wyoming